This is a list of Nigerian films released in 2010.

Films

See also
List of Nigerian films

References

External links
2010 films at the Internet Movie Database

2010
Lists of 2010 films by country or language
Films